Natasja Clausen (born 19 April 1992) is a Danish handball player who played for Nykøbing Falster Håndboldklub between 2019 and 2021.

References

1992 births
Living people
Danish female handball players
Nykøbing Falster Håndboldklub players
People from Rødovre
Sportspeople from the Capital Region of Denmark